Mimetridium is a genus of sea anemones of the family Acontiophoridae. It currently includes only one species Mimetridium cryptum.

Taxonomy 
Both the genus and the species were first described by Cadet Hand, the former director of the Bodega Marine Laboratory, in 1961. The holotype specimen is held at the Otago Museum.

Description 
Dr Elizabeth J. Batham described this species as:

Distribution 
This species was described from New Zealand and has been recorded off the coasts of Dunedin and Wellington.

Habitat 
M. cryptum is normally attached to a shell or rock in mud or sand and prefers to be half buried. However, this species is known to both burrow into the sand as well as walk.

References

External links 

 Mimetridium discussed on RNZ Critter of the Week, 5 August 2022

Acontiophoridae
Hexacorallia genera